The 2005 Nias–Simeulue earthquake occurred on 28 March off the west coast of northern Sumatra, Indonesia. At least 915 people were killed, mostly on the island of Nias. The event caused panic in the region, which had already been devastated by the massive tsunami triggered by the 2004 Indian Ocean earthquake, but this earthquake generated a relatively small tsunami that caused limited damage. It was the third most powerful earthquake since 1965 in Indonesia.

The earthquake occurred at 16:09:37 UTC (23:09:37 local time) on 28 March 2005.

Earthquake and damage

The earthquake lasted for about two minutes. In the twenty-four hours immediately after the event, there were eight major aftershocks, measuring between 5.5 and 6.0. Despite the proximity of the epicenter to that for the 2004 Indian Ocean earthquake, it ruptured a separate segment of the Sunda megathrust and was most likely triggered by stress changes associated with that earlier event.

On the Indonesian island of Nias, off the coast of Sumatra, hundreds of buildings were destroyed. The death toll on Nias was at least one thousand, with 220 dying in Gunungsitoli, the island's largest town. Nearly half of Gunungsitoli's population (27,000) fled.

The earthquake was strongly felt across the island of Sumatra and caused widespread power outages in the Indonesian city of Banda Aceh, already devastated by the December 2004 tsunami, and prompted thousands to flee their homes and seek higher ground. It was strongly felt along the west coast of Thailand and Malaysia, and in Kuala Lumpur high-rise buildings were evacuated. The earthquake was felt less strongly in the Maldives, India, and Sri Lanka.

Tsunami
The earthquake caused great concern around the Indian Ocean that it might trigger a tsunami similar to the massive one generated three months earlier by the 2004 Indian Ocean earthquake on 26 December 2004. Evacuations were carried out in coastal regions of Thailand, Malaysia, and Sri Lanka. This earthquake, however, produced a relatively small tsunami. A  tsunami caused moderate damage to port and airport facilities on Simeulue, and a  tsunami was recorded on the west coast of Nias. Much smaller waves, most detectable only in tide gauge recording systems, were recorded across the Indian Ocean; for example, a  wave was recorded at Colombo, Sri Lanka.

Tsunami warnings were issued by the Pacific Tsunami Warning Center, operated by the US National Oceanic and Atmospheric Administration (NOAA), and by the government of Thailand. There were initial concerns that a major tsunami could be generated, particularly travelling south from the event's hypocenter.

Evacuations occurred in the northern Malaysian states of Penang and Kedah, as well as the eastern coast of Sri Lanka, where ten people were killed in the confusion of the evacuation. Many of the southern states of India were put on high alert; all of these areas had seen significant damage from December's tsunami. After the detection of a minor tsunami south of the epicenter, including a 30 cm tsunami on Australia's Cocos Islands, the Indian Ocean island states of Mauritius, Madagascar, and the Seychelles issued warnings to their populations. Although tsunami warning systems for the region had been actively discussed before the December 2004 earthquake, none had yet been implemented in the Indian Ocean.

Humanitarian response
 
The United Nations worked with the Indonesian government to take further actions to prevent a possible catastrophe after the strong earthquake. The United States Department of State announced that it will help countries affected by a possible tsunami. The government of India announced aid of US$2 million for victims.

Australia announced it would provide A$1 million in emergency aid and, at the request of the Indonesian Government, dispatched Australian Defence Force medical teams and equipment to Nias. The Australian naval ship HMAS Kanimbla, having only recently left Aceh, was redeployed to the region from Singapore. At about 09:30 (UTC) 2 April 2005, one of Kanimbla's two Sea King helicopters, Shark 02, crashed on the island of Nias while taking medical personnel to a village. Nine personnel were killed, and two others sustained injuries but were rescued from the site by the other helicopter. The crash occurred one day before a state visit by President Susilo Bambang Yudhoyono to Australia, where he and Prime Minister of Australia John Howard expressed mutual sorrow for their countries' losses.

See also

 2006 Yogyakarta earthquake
 2009 Sumatra earthquakes
 1843 Nias earthquake
 List of megathrust earthquakes
 List of earthquakes in 2005
 List of earthquakes in Indonesia

References

Further reading

External links 

Lethal quake rattles tsunami zone – BBC News
Earthquake causes coral reefs to die – CTV News
Great Earthquake and Tsunami of 28 March 2005 in Sumatra, Indonesia – George Pararas-Carayannis

2005 disasters in Indonesia
2005
2005 earthquakes
2005 in Indonesia
2005 Sumatra
Tsunamis in Indonesia
March 2005 events in Asia